Robert Edwin Thomas (20 March 1939 – 26 January 2016) was a New Zealand long jumper who still holds the current national long jump record of 8.05m. He won three national titles in the long jump.

Personal bests

References

All Athletics profile

1939 births
2016 deaths
New Zealand male long jumpers